Telepoll was a Canadian talk show television series which aired on CTV between 1961 and 1965. It was hosted by Royce Frith.

Premise
Each week, a guest panel was invited to discuss a current event. Pre-selected viewers were also polled and their responses were tabulated and presented on the next show. Each episode cost an estimated $3500, among the most expensive domestic CTV productions. CNCP Telecommunications was Telepoll'''s sponsor.

Peter Jennings, then based at CTV's Ottawa affiliate CJOH-TV, was a correspondent for the program.

Notable episodes
Glen Haw, a lawyer for the Jehovah's Witnesses sect appeared on 14 January 1961 to discuss their doctrine against blood transfusions. Haw stormed off the set following a statement by Kildare Dobbs, another panelist on that episode.

The newspaper industry was the subject of a 3 January 1965 episode. The poll on that occasion found that three-quarters of respondents felt that Canada's papers did a "good job" covering the news, although 55% of those polled indicated the papers placed too much emphasis on sensationalism.

BroadcastTelepoll'''s debut was on 3 December 1961, two months after the CTV network began its broadcasts.

References

External links
 Telepoll at Canadian Communications Foundation
 Telepoll at TVArchive.ca

1961 Canadian television series debuts
1965 Canadian television series endings
CTV Television Network original programming
1960s Canadian television talk shows
Television shows filmed in Toronto